Martin Peak is a peak,  high, standing  northeast of Nance Ridge in the Thomas Hills, in the northern Patuxent Range of the Pensacola Mountains, Antarctica. It was mapped by the United States Geological Survey from surveys and U.S. Navy air photos from 1956 to 1966, and was named by the Advisory Committee on Antarctic Names for Christopher Martin, a biologist at Palmer Station, summer 1966–67.

References

Mountains of Queen Elizabeth Land
Pensacola Mountains